Sennedjem was an Ancient Egyptian artisan. Sennedjem lived in Set Maat (translated as "The Place of Truth"), contemporary Deir el-Medina, on the west bank of the Nile, opposite Thebes, during the reigns of Seti I and Ramesses II. Sennedjem had the title "Servant in the Place of Truth". He was buried along with his wife, Iyneferti, and family in a tomb in the village necropolis. His tomb was discovered January 31, 1886. When Sennedjem's tomb was found, in it there was regular furniture from his home, including a stool and a bed, which he actually used when he was alive.

His titles included Servant in the Place of Truth, meaning that he worked on the excavation and decoration of the nearby royal tombs.

See also

TT1 – (Tomb of Sennedjem, family and wife)

References

Nineteenth Dynasty of Egypt
Ancient Egyptian artists